Wang Bi (226–249), courtesy name Fusi, was a Chinese philosopher and politician, expertise in Yijing and Xuanxue

Life
Wang Bi served as a minor bureaucrat in the state of Cao Wei during the Three Kingdoms period. He was married with a daughter when he died of sickness at the age of 23.

Wang Bi's most important works are commentaries on Laozi's Tao Te Ching and the I Ching. The text of the Tao Te Ching that appeared with his commentary was widely considered the best copy of his work until the discovery of the Han-era Mawangdui texts in 1973. He was a scholar of Xuanxue.

Writings 
At least three works by Wang Bi are known: a commentary on Confucius' Analects, which survives only in quotations; commentaries on the I Ching and the Tao Te Ching, which not only have survived but have greatly influenced subsequent Chinese thought on those two classics.

His commentary on the I Ching has been translated into English by Richard John Lynn, The Classic of Changes (New York: Columbia University, 1994) 

Several translations into English have been made of his commentary of the Tao Te Ching:
 Ariane Rump, translator Commentary on the Lao Tzu by Wang Pi, Monographs of the Society for Asian and Comparative Philosophy, No. 6 (Honolulu: University of Hawaii, 1979) 
 Richard John Lynn, translator The Classic of the Way and Virtue; A New Translation of the Tao-te Ching of Laozi as Interpreted by Wang Bi (New York: Columbia University, 1999) 
 Rudolf Wagner, translator. A Chinese Reading of the Daodejing: Wang Bi's Commentary on the Laozi with Critical Text and Translation (Albany: State University of New York Press, 2003)

See also
 Lists of people of the Three Kingdoms

References

Works cited 

 Chen, Shou (3rd century). Records of the Three Kingdoms (Sanguozhi).
 Pei, Songzhi (5th century). Annotations to Records of the Three Kingdoms (Sanguozhi zhu).

External links
 Wang Bi in the Internet Encyclopedia of Philosophy

226 births
249 deaths
3rd-century Chinese philosophers
Cao Wei politicians
Cao Wei Taoists
Cao Wei writers
Philosophers from Shandong
Politicians from Shandong
Three Kingdoms philosophers
Xuanxue
Writers from Shandong
Chinese classicists